Manon Lescaut is a 1940 Italian historical drama film directed by Carmine Gallone and starring Alida Valli, Vittorio De Sica and Lamberto Picasso. It is an adaptation of the Abbé Prévost's novel of the same title.

The film was made at the Cinecittà studios in Rome with sets designed by the art directors Ivo Battelli and Guido Fiorini.

Cast
 Alida Valli as Manon Lescaut  
 Vittorio De Sica as Renato Des Grieux  
 Lamberto Picasso as Il visconte Des Grieux  
 Giulio Donadio as Il marquese De Brienne  
 Dino Di Luca as Il sergente Lescaut  
 Jole Voleri as Musette  
 Lilia Dale as Denise  
 Andrea Checchi as Marius  
 Guglielmo Barnabò as Il governatore di New Orleans  
 Carlo Bressan as Edmond  
 Aroldo Tieri as Il segretario di De Brienne  
 Oreste Fares as Il cappellano  
 Amina Pirani Maggi as Una nobile pettegola al ballo  
 Lola Braccini as La direttrice 
 Pina Gallini as Una dei tre creditori  
 Giuseppe Pierozzi as Un dei tre creditori  
 Cesare Polacco as Un dei tre creditori 
 Luigi Allodoli 
 Diana Karenne 
 Guido Notari 
 Michele Riccardini 
 Anna Vivaldi
 Maria-Pia Vivaldi

References

Bibliography
 Klossner, Michael. The Europe of 1500-1815 on Film and Television. McFarland & Company, 2002.

External links
 

1940 films
1940s historical drama films
1940s Italian-language films
Italian historical drama films
Films based on works by Antoine François Prévost
Films directed by Carmine Gallone
Films set in the 18th century
Films shot at Cinecittà Studios
Italian black-and-white films
1940 drama films
1940s Italian films